Henry Chimunthu Banda is a Malawian politician who was the Speaker of the National Assembly of Malawi from May 2009 to May 2014. He was elected in 2009 as the Chair of the 19 member Commonwealth Parliamentary Association, Africa region.

He also served for a time as Minister of Energy and Minister of Mining, Youth Sports and Culture.

Early life and education

Banda is from Chipembere village in Nkhotakota District, Central Malawi. He received a Diploma in Education obtained from the University of Malawi in 1984. Subsequently, he earned a Diploma in Education Management which he acquired from Brandon University. He joined the Ministry of Education as a Diploma teacher in 1985 and was posted to Euthini Secondary School in Northern Malawi until May 1989. He was posted to his home district of Nkhotakota where he rose to become headteacher of the school. In 1993-1995, he became the Regional Publications Officer for the National Teachers Union of Malawi.

Political career

At the 1999 general elections, Hon C Banda was elected as Member of Parliament for the Nkhotakota North Constituency, and from August 1999 to September 2001, he was Chairman of the Parliamentary Committee on the Environment. From January 2000 to September 2001, he was Commissioner in the Parliamentary Service Commission and subsequently Minister of Mines, Natural Resources and Environmental Affairs. In June 2004 he was appointed as the Minister of Youth, Sports and Culture. He also served as Minister of Energy and Mining and helped to secure the Paladin Energy mining deal with Goodall Gondwe. He also served as Deputy Minister of Foreign Affairs.

Personal life
Chimunthu-Banda is married and has three children with whom he and his wife reside with in Lilongwe.

References

1962 births
Living people
People from Nkhotakota District
Democratic Progressive Party (Malawi) politicians
Government ministers of Malawi
Members of the National Assembly (Malawi)
Speakers of the National Assembly (Malawi)